Pajacuarán is a town and seat of the municipality of Pajacuarán, in the central Mexican state of Michoacán. As of 2010, the town had a population of 10,014.
In 2015, the population of Michoacán Pajacuarán was around 21,028. It is also the hometown of Luis and Marcela Chavez.

References

Populated places in Michoacán